Annibale Ajmone-Marsan (Turin, 29 February 1888 - London, 5 March 1956) was an Italian entrepreneur, sports manager and football player, with a midfielder role. He was the brother of Riccardo (III) and Alessandro (I), son of a financier of the club, the entrepreneur Marco Ajmone-Marsan, who was originally from Crosa. His surname in the match tables is sometimes reported as Aimone or Aymone. He was manager of Juventus and attorney general of the entrepreneur Riccardo Gualino.

References

Further reading
 
 

1888 births
1956 deaths
Footballers from Turin
Italian footballers
Juventus F.C. players
Association football midfielders
Businesspeople from Turin